Sheykh Mahalleh (also Romanized as Sheykh Maḩalleh; also known as Shāh Mahalleh and Shakhmagalle) is a village in Jirdeh Rural District, in the Central District of Shaft County, Gilan Province, Iran. At the 2006 census, its population was 319, in 85 families.

References 

Populated places in Shaft County